Heather Seymour "Judy" Guinness (14 August 1910 – 24 October 1952) was a British fencer. She won a silver medal in the women's individual foil event at the 1932 Summer Olympics. The judges had awarded her the gold medal but, in a noted gesture of fair play, she informed them they had failed to count two hits achieved by her Austrian opponent Ellen Preis.

She was a daughter of Henry Guinness (d.1945), an Irish engineer, banker and politician. In 1934 she married the racing driver Clifton Penn-Hughes. He died in a plane crash and she remarried John Henning in 1942. She died in 1952 at Springhare Farm in Rhodesia.

References

External links
 

1910 births
1952 deaths
British female fencers
Olympic fencers of Great Britain
Fencers at the 1932 Summer Olympics
Fencers at the 1936 Summer Olympics
Olympic silver medallists for Great Britain
Olympic medalists in fencing
Sportspeople from Dublin (city)
Medalists at the 1932 Summer Olympics
Judy